Henry Robert Margarita (November 3, 1920 – July 28, 2008) was an American football halfback and coach.  He was a two-time honorable mention All-American at Brown University, once rushing for 233 yards against Columnbia, the fourth-highest single-game rushing total in school history.  Margarita played for the Chicago Bears from 1944 to 1946, leading the team in rushing in 1945.  Following his playing career, he took the head coaching job at Georgetown University, compiling a 7–12 record in two seasons (1949–1950) and leading the Hoyas to the Sun Bowl in his first season.  After a disappointing 2–7 record in his second season, the university decided to disband the football team, citing travel expenses and high rent at Griffith Stadium.  Margarita was the last Hoya football coach until 1964, when the sport was revived at the club level.
Margarita is a member of the Medford (MA) Athletic Hall of Fame, the Brown University Hall of Fame, the Massachusetts High School Football Coaches Hall of Fame and the Stoneham High School Hall of Fame.

Head coaching record

References
 Margarita, Henry Robert. "Henry R, "Bob" Margarita", The Boston Herald, July 29, 2008. Retrieved on July 29, 2008.
 Margarita, Henry Robert. "Bob Margarita, Bears standout and local coach, dies", The Boston Globe, July 30, 2008.  Retrieved on July 30, 2008.
 Margarita, Henry Robert. "Bob Margarita, 87; Bears star was long time coach at Stoneham High", The Boston Globe, July 31, 2008.  Retrieved on July 31, 2008.

External links
 

1920 births
2008 deaths
American football halfbacks
Brown Bears football players
Chicago Bears players
Georgetown Hoyas football coaches
Sportspeople from Boston
Coaches of American football from Massachusetts
Players of American football from Boston